The 1917 Wyoming Cowboys football team was an American football team that represented the University of Wyoming as a member of the Rocky Mountain Conference (RMC) during the 1917 college football season. In their third season under head coach John Corbett, the Cowboys compiled a 3–4 record (1–4 against conference opponents), finished seventh in the RMC, and were outscored by a total of 140 to 24.

Schedule

References

Wyoming
Wyoming Cowboys football seasons
Wyoming Cowboys football